Isaac ben Judah ibn Ghiyyat (or Ghayyat) (ibn Ghayyath) (1030/1038–1089) was a Spanish rabbi, Biblical commentator, codifier of Jewish law, philosopher, and liturgical poet. He was born and lived in the town of Lucena, where he also headed a rabbinic academy. He died in Cordoba.

Etymology of name
As most Spanish Jewish surnames, Ibn Ghiyyat is patronymic, meaning "the son of Ghiyyat." "Ghiyyat" is a name of Arabic origin, meaning "salvation." The word "Ghiyyat" is also found in Saadia Gaon's Judeo-Arabic translation of the Hebrew word , in Psalm 20:17.

Background
According to some authorities he was the teacher of Isaac Alfasi; according to others, his fellow pupil. His best-known students were his son Judah ibn Ghayyat, Joseph ibn Sahl, and Moses ibn Ezra. He was held in great esteem by Samuel ha-Nagid and his son Joseph, and after the latter's death (1066), Ibn Ghayyat was elected to succeed him as rabbi of Lucena, where he officiated until his death.

He was the author of a compendium of ritual laws concerning the festivals, published by Seligman Baer Bamberger under the title of Sha'arei Simḥah (Fürth, 1862; the laws concerning Passover were republished by Bernhard Zomber under the title Hilkhot Pesaḥim, Berlin, 1864), and a philosophical commentary on Ecclesiastes, known only through quotations in the works of later authors.

Ibn Ghayyat's greatest activity was in liturgical poetry; he was an author of hundreds of piyyutim, and his hymns are found in the Maḥzor of Tripoli under the title of Siftei Renanot. Most are written in the new Andalusian style. He achieved special distinction in his melodious muwashshaḥat (girdle poems), a secular Arabic form first used as a vehicle for liturgical poetry by Solomon ibn Gabirol. 

One of his major contributions was his collection and arrangement of the geonic responsa which had hitherto been scattered among world's Jewry.

References

 Its bibliography:
Joseph Derenbourg, in Geiger's Wiss. Zeit. Jüd. Theol. v. 396–412;
Michael Sachs, Religiöse Poesie, pp. 259–262;
Grätz, Gesch. 3d ed., vi. 61, 77;
Zunz, Literaturgesch. pp. 194–200;
idem, in Allg. Zeit. des Jud. 1839, p. 480;
L. Dukes, in Orient, Lit. ix. 536–540; x. 667, 668;
Landshuth, 'Ammude ha-'Ahodah, pp. 111–116;
De Rossi, Dizionario, pp. 173–174;
Steinschneider, Cat. Bodl. cols. 1110–1111.

External links
 Sha'arei Simḥah: Vol. 1 and Vol. 2
 Hilkhot Pesaḥim

Ghiyyat, Isaac ibn
Ghiyyat, Isaac ibn
Ghiyyat, Isaac ibn
Ghiyyat, Isaac ibn
Ghiyyat, Isaac ibn
Authors of books on Jewish law
People from Lucena, Córdoba